Guardian Prime is a fictional comicbook character owned by Comic Republic Global Network.  He was created by Comic Republic pioneers Jide Martin and Wale Awelenje as one of three proposed flagship characters for the at-the-time unnamed venture. 

Guardian Prime briefly appeared for the first time in comic strips attached to movie schedule flyers in Nigerian cinemas. 

Subsequently, he appeared in Might Of Guardian Prime Issue 1, Produced by: Jide Martin, Michael Balogun, and the Ezeogu brothers (Ozo and Tobe)

Jide Martin, in an interview with The Guardian, said of his motivation to create the character: "I saw that Nigeria was filled with so much negativity. This hero [was] designed to give us faith to see that our actions and words could indeed make a difference and throw a positive light on Nigeria to a global audience"

Powers and abilities 
Guardian Prime is described in the Comic Republic series as "Man, the way his creator intended him to be" and "The fifth element, one of the five essential elements for life to exist on Earth (Earth, Water, Air, Fire and Man-to stand guard over the others)"

He has invulnerability, super strength, flight, speed, enhanced senses, ability to intensify his body heat, and the ability to temporarily pass his invulnerability to any object he touches. Guardian Prime has immense strength, his notable feats of strength include carrying an Airbus aeroplane, ripping a helicopter into two, and he is so strong that he has  even been seen as being able to carry an asteroid. Guardian Prime can fly at supersonic speeds, his most notable feat of speed is that he was able to fly from the sun back to the Earth in fifteen minutes. He can survive in space without the use of any breathing equipment. He can intensify his body heat and create fire. Gaiya once said that he "can burn brighter than a blue star.Guardian Prime has gone up against eevruwih,the spirit of aggression. NACSS commander, Jade Waziri's information classifies him as being a red class para human.

Fictional Character Biography
Born in Lagos, Nigeria,to Nigerian parents,Tunde Jaiye is the son of Danjuma Jaiye,a military general, and Evelyn Jaiye, a businesswoman. From a young age, Tunde has lived a sheltered life, but nevertheless,has always believed in being compassionate and protecting the weak. When he becomes an Adult, He finds out that he is a Guardian. Guardians are special humans tasked with protecting the Human race, and they are ordained by Gaia, the  Goddess of the Earth. Every 2000 years,a new guardian is born into the world.Depending on the state of the world, some guardians live out their entire lives without ever knowing who they really are, as their powers never manifest until they are needed most. With the world in turmoil and with his newfound powers and abilities, Tunde Jaiye sets out to save the world as Guardian prime.

References

Fictional Nigerian people
Comics superheroes
Fictional characters with superhuman senses
Magazine mascots
Male characters in comics
Male characters in advertising
Mascots introduced in 2013
Comics characters introduced in 2013